The Journal of Asthma is a peer-reviewed medical journal that covers asthma and related conditions.

Editor 
The editor-in-chief of Journal of Asthma is Jonathan A. Bernstein, who practices Allergy & Immunology in Cincinnati, Ohio.

References 

Publications established in 1963
Pulmonology journals
English-language journals
Taylor & Francis academic journals
10 times per year journals